George Cushingberry Jr. (born January 6, 1953) is an American politician from Michigan. Cushingberry was a member of the Detroit City Council and a member of Michigan House of Representatives.

Early life 
On January 6, 1953, Cushingberry was born in Detroit,  Michigan. Cushingberry's father was George Cushingberry. Cushingberry's mother was Edna Cushingberry. In 1971, Cushingberry graduated from Detroit Cass Technical High School.

Education 
Cushingberry earned a bachelor's degree and a master's degree in Political Science, Urban Politics, Policy, and Administration from Wayne State University. In 1991 he earned his Juris Doctor from the University of Detroit Mercy School of Law.

Career 
Elected in 1975, Cushingberry became the youngest person to serve in the Michigan State House, where he served until 1982. After leaving the House, he became a member of the Wayne County Board of Commissioners, where he served for sixteen years.

On November 2, 2004, Cushingberry won the election and became a Democratic member of Michigan House of Representatives for District 8. Cushingberry defeated Melvin E. Byrd with 95.69% of the votes. On November 
7, 2006, as an incumbent, Cushingberry won the election and continued serving District 8. Cushingberry defeated Melvin E. Byrd and Daniel L. Martin with 96.59% of the votes. On November 4, 2008, as an incumbent, Cushingberry won the election and continued serving District 8. Cushingberry defeated Thomas W. Jones with 96.90% of the votes.

After being elected Cushingberry was appointed the Chairman of the Appropriations Committee until 2010.  After an unsuccessful run for State Senator, Cushingberry ran for City Council representing District 2 in Northwest Detroit winning by over 50% of the districts voters. Cushingberry was elected President Pro-Tempore of the City Council in 2014 and appointed Chairman of the Budget, Finance and, Audit Committee.

Cushingberry is an associate pastor at Northwest Unity Baptist Church in Detroit. He is a life member of the National Association for the Advancement of Colored People (NAACP), and hosts the  "Northwest Unity Prospector Reveals", on radio station WDRJ 1440 AM, Detroit MI from 2:30 - 3:30 every Saturday.  He is also a practicing Attorney in the following areas family law, commercial litigation(Business Law), bankruptcy, criminal defense and, owner of The Law Firm of George Cushingberry and Associates.

Personal life 
Cushingberry's wife is Maria Hazel Drew Cushingberry. They have two children.

References

External links 
 George Cushingberry Jr at ballotpedia.org

1953 births
Living people
Lawyers from Detroit
Politicians from Detroit
African-American state legislators in Michigan
Detroit City Council members
Wayne State University alumni
University of Detroit Mercy alumni
Democratic Party members of the Michigan House of Representatives
Baptist ministers from the United States
21st-century African-American people
20th-century African-American people